Hell's Corner is a crime novel written by David Baldacci. This is the fifth and final installment to feature the Camel Club, a small group of Washington, D.C. civilian misfits led by "Oliver Stone", an ex-Green Beret and a former CIA trained assassin. The book was initially published on November 9, 2010 by Grand Central Publishing.

References

External links
Official website

2010 American novels
Novels by David Baldacci
Grand Central Publishing books